Haujobb is a German electronic musical project whose output has ranged drastically within the electronic music spectrum, from electro-industrial to ambient and techno. They have become a staple crossover act, bringing several forms of electro into the mainstream industrial music world.

History
Haujobb was formed in 1993 by Daniel Myer, Dejan Samardzic, and Björn Junemann.  Hailing from Germany, the trio were inspired by the music of Skinny Puppy, as Myer recalls: "When Too Dark Park was released... this was the initiative for us to make this kind of music." The name comes from the German translation of "skin job" from the film Blade Runner.  They were soon signed to Off Beat, and began distributing their music in North America via Pendragon Records.

Following the release of Freeze Frame Reality in 1995 saw the departure of bandmate Björn, the lineup has consisted of Daniel and Dejan ever since. After Metropolis Records acquired Pendragon, the two musicians have been able to spread their music to a larger fanbase in North America, and have remained continuously popular in the European industrial music scene.

Over the course of their subsequent releases in the 1990s, they wove increasing amounts of drum 'n' bass and IDM influence into their sound. 1999's NinetyNine was a sparse, downtempo collection of ambient electronic compositions. They have since reintroduced some of the more rhythmic elements back into their sound on their more recent albums, but have continued to experiment, drawing concepts from a wide variety of musical styles.

In 2011 Haujobb released a new album with the title New World March which according to the band uses more hardware, guitars, drums, and sound recordings compared to software based Vertical Theory of 2003.

In 2013 Haujobb created their own production label, Basic Unit Productions, and began releasing other artists such as Div|ider, Blush Response, and Black Nail Cabaret. Basic Unit Productions also released two compilations under the title Frost. In September 2015, Haujobb released the minimal-wave influenced, Blendwerk on Basic Unit Productions in Germany and on Negative Gain Productions in the United States. In early Haujobb liner notes and credits, Daniel was listed as D. Meier, however in more recent liner notes he is listed as Daniel Myer.

Projects

Today, both Daniel Myer and Dejan Samardzic continue to record music under the name Haujobb – the duo also briefly recorded as Dots+Dashes. Myer has several other projects of his own, including Architect, Clear Vision (initially a collaboration with Thorsten Meier) as well as a number of other short-lived electronic projects. Myer, along with Claire Voyant's Victoria Lloyd, form HMB. While Newt is a collaboration with Andreas Meyer of Forma Tadre. More recent side-project collaborations of Myer include Destroid, also featuring Rinaldo Ribi Bite and Sebastian Ullmann and Radioaktivists with Frank M. Spinath, Krischan Jan-Eric Wesenberg and Sascha Lange. Daniel Myer also created the soundtrack for the Xbox game Tao Feng: Fist of the Lotus.

Discography

As Haujobb
 Drift Wheeler (1993) CS (demo cassette)
 Homes and Gardens (1993) 
 Eye Over You (1994) single
 Freeze Frame Reality (1995) 
 Frames: The Remix Album (1996) EP
 Remix Wars Part One (vs. Wumpscut) (1996) EP
 Solutions for a Small Planet (1996) 
 From Homes to Planets (1997) (best of)
 Matrix (1997) 2CD
 Ninetynine (1999) – #16 CMJ RPM Chart
 Ninetynine Remixes (1999) 
 Polarity (2001) – #4 CMJ RPM Chart; #27 CMJ RPM for year 2001
 Penetration (2002) EP
 Vertical Theory (2003) 
 Vertical Mixes (2005) – #4 German Alternative Charts (DAC)
 Smack My Bitch Up (2007) EP
 Dead Market (2011) EP
 New World March (2011)
 Let's Drop Bombs (2012) Remix 
 Blendwerk (2015)
 Alive (2018) Live

As Cleaner/Cleen/Clear Vision
 See separate article

As Destroid
 Future Prophecies (2004)
 Loudspeaker (2007)
 Silent World EP (2010)

As Architect
 Galactic Supermarket (1998) – #39 CMJ RPM Chart
 Galactic Edge 12" (1998)
 I Went Out Shopping To Get Some Noise (2003)
 Noise Is Out Of Stock 12" (2005)
 The Analysis Of Noise Trading (2005)
 Lower Lip Interface (2007)
 Consume Adapt Create (2010)
 Upload Select Remix (2011)
 Upload Select Remix 2 (Digital only release) (2011)
 Mine (2013) 
 Mine Remixes 2 (2014) (featuring remixes Dreissk and Textbeak)

As h_m_b
 Great Industrial Love Affairs (2001)

As Newt
 -273°C (1997)
 Phaseshifting EP (1998)
 37°C  (1999)

As Dots+Dashes
 Aircutter EP (1997)
 Dots & Dashes (1998)
 Selected Drum Works Vol 1 EP (1998)

As Aktivist
 Ein Abend Mit Mir... 12" (1998)

As S'Apex
 Out There Back On 12" (1998)
 Audiodesign (1999)
 Henryk Remixes (2000)

As Hexer
 R:A Vs. Hexer: Compress (1998)
 Hexer Vs. Omega Men (1998)
 Hexer vs. Crunch (1999)
 Paradoxon I & II (1999)

As Myer
 Contra Technique (1998)
 Style 12" (1997)
 Pressure Drop (1998)
 Leavin' Space (1998)

As Standeg
 Ultrahightechviolet (2008)
 Rushing Pictures EP (2008)

See also
List of industrial music bands

Notes

References

External links

Haujobb official site
D. Myer official website (archived)

Electro-industrial music groups
German industrial music groups
Cyberpunk music
Metropolis Records artists
Dependent Records artists
Off Beat label artists